Jan z Jenštejna,  (1348 in Prague, Bohemia, Crown of Bohemia – 17 June 1400 in Rome) was the Archbishop of Prague from 1379 to 1396. He studied in Bologna, Padova, Montpellier and Paris. He was also a poet, writer and composer.

Life 
In 1379 he became the owner of the castle Hrádek. In 1379 he succeeded to the archbishopric of his uncle Jan Očko z Vlašimi who had stepped down. Soon he became Chancellor to Wenceslaus IV of Bohemia. The next year the capital was struck by a Plague epidemic, which struck him as well. He recovered, but this episode left deep scars on his character and he began to examine theological and philosophical problems at his castle Helfenburk u Úštěka.
He had abandoned public life because of a quarrel with Wenceslav IV, which was mainly over the matter of the Popes of Avignon. Jan was still loyal to Pope Urban VI, to whom the king was not. In 1384 he left his chancellor post. The quarrel with the king removed him completely from political life, and he retired to his castle and abandoned the post of archbishop on 2 July 1396. He was succeeded as archbishop by Olbram ze Škvorce.

While on his castle, he fell from a newly built tower and miraculously managed to grab hold of something before falling to the ground.
He died in Rome in 1400, and all his possessions, including his castle, passed to the Archbishops of Prague.

Artistic works 
His musical works were compiled in the book "Die Hymnen Johanns von Jenstein, Erzbischofs von Prag" of Q. M. Dreves. The book was published in German in 1886. His literary activity was very rich and includes not only religious and philosophical works, but also poems.

References 
 Weltsch, Ruben Ernest (1968) Archbishop John of Jenstein (1348–1400): papalism, humanism and reform in pre-Hussite Prague Mouton, The Hague, OCLC 963607
 Wratislaw, Albert Henry (1878) "John of Jenstein, archbishop of Prague, 1378-1397" Transactions of the Royal Historical Society 7: pp. 30–57
  (1999) Jan Milíč z Kroměříže a Jan z Jenštejna Cisterciana Sarensis, Žďár nad Sázavou, OCLC 44149277, in Czech
  (1938) Jan z Jenštejna: Mariánský a eucharistický horlitel české gotiky Vítězové, profesoři bohosloveckého učiliště řádu dominikánského, Olomouc, OCLC 85601162 in Czech
 Holinka, Rudolf (1933) Církevní politika arcibiskupa Jana z Jenštejna za pontifikátu Urbana VI: Studie z dĕjin velikého schismatu zapadního University Komenskeho, Bratislava, OCLC 19047598 in Czech

Further reading
 
  

 This article is based in part on material from the Czech Wikipedia.

1348 births
1400 deaths
Roman Catholic archbishops of Prague
14th-century Roman Catholic archbishops in the Holy Roman Empire
14th-century composers
14th-century Bohemian poets
Czech male poets
Czech male classical composers
Czech classical composers
Czech philosophers
Czech expatriates in Italy
Medieval male composers
People from the Kingdom of Bohemia